Payzac may refer to:
 Payzac, Ardèche, France
 Payzac, Dordogne, France